Emily Jean Spencer Ashbrook (née Spencer; born September 21, 1934) is a former American politician. She is the widow of Congressman John M. Ashbrook, a Republican from Ohio. She then completed her late husband's final term of office, also as a Republican.

Biography 
Ashbrook was born Emily Jean Spencer on September 21, 1934, in Cincinnati, Ohio. She attended Central School in Newark, Ohio, and graduated from Newark High School in 1952. She went on to graduate with a bachelor's degree from Ohio State University, where she was a member of Kappa Alpha Theta, in 1956.

She married John M. Ashbrook in 1974. After her husband's death on April 24, 1982, she won the special election for the seat in Congress he had occupied; it is relatively common in American politics of the last several decades for widows to succeed their late husbands in office if only to complete their husbands' terms. She served for the remainder of the 97th Congress and represented Ohio's 17th congressional district from June 29, 1982 to January 3, 1983.

During her term, her only ambition was "to carry on John's conservative philosophy." She was a supporter of the Reagan administration and served on the Committee on Merchant Marine and Fisheries. She did speak out for her views including introducing a bill that would have denied federal law enforcement jurisdiction to implement gun control ordinances; a bill to prescribe mandatory minimum sentences for federal felonies against senior citizens; supported the Enterprise Zone Tax Act of 1982; and backed a bill to educate citizens on the dangers of communism and promote democracy abroad.

She currently resides in Newark, Ohio.

See also 
 List of United States representatives from Ohio
 Women in the United States House of Representatives

References

1934 births
Female members of the United States House of Representatives
Living people
Ohio State University alumni
Politicians from Newark, Ohio
Spouses of Ohio politicians
Women in Ohio politics
20th-century American politicians
20th-century American women politicians
Republican Party members of the United States House of Representatives from Ohio
21st-century American women